Jan Pinborg (1937–1982) was a renowned historian of medieval linguistics and philosophy of language, and the most famous member of the Copenhagen School of Medieval Philosophy pioneered by Heinrich Roos in the 1940s.  Pinborg was a pupil of Roos.

Works
 Die Entwicklung der Sprachtheorie im Mittelalter, Münster: Aschendorff, 1967.
 Logik und Semantik im Mittelalter: ein Überblick, with an afterword by von Helmut Kohlenberger, Stuttgart, Bad Cannstatt: Frommann-Holzboog, 1972. (Italian translation: Logica e Semantica nel Medioevo, Torino: Boringhieri, 1984.)
 Medieval Semantics: Selected Studies on Medieval Logic and Grammar, edited by Sten Ebbesen, London: Variorum Reprints, 1984.
 Jan Pinborg (ed.), The Logic of John Buridan:  Acts of the 3rd European Symposium on Medieval Logic and Semantics, Copenhagen, 16-21 November 1975, Copenhagen: Museum Tusculanum, 1976.

He was a co-editor, along with Norman Kretzmann and Anthony Kenny, of The Cambridge History of Later Medieval Philosophy (1982).

Notes

Sources and further reading
 Norman Kretzmann, Anthony Kenny, and Jan Pinborg, (eds), with Eleanor Stump, associate editor. The Cambridge History of Later Medieval Philosophy:  From the Rediscovery of Aristotle to the Disintegration of Scholasticism, 1100-1600, New York: Cambridge University Press, 1982.
 Norman Kretzmann (ed.). Meaning and Inference in Medieval Philosophy:  Studies in Memory of Jan Pinborg, Dordrecht: Kluwer, 1988.
 G. L. Bursill-Hall, Sten Ebbesen, and Konrad Koerner (eds.). De Ortu Grammaticae: Studies in Medieval Grammar and Linguistic Theory in Honor of Jan Pinborg, Philadelphia: J. Benjamins, 1990.

20th-century Danish philosophers
Danish medievalists
Danish historians of philosophy
1937 births
1982 deaths
Philosophers of language
20th-century Danish historians